Gary Leroy Langford (born 1953), is a male former weightlifter who competed for Great Britain and England.

Weightlifting career
Langford represented Great Britain in the 1976 Summer Olympics and the 1980 Summer Olympics.

He represented England and won a gold medal in the 90 kg middle-heavyweight, at the 1978 Commonwealth Games in Edmonton, Alberta, Canada. Four years later he represented England and won a silver medal in the 100 kg sub-heavyweight division, at the 1982 Commonwealth Games in Brisbane, Queensland, Australia.

References

1953 births
English male weightlifters
Commonwealth Games medallists in weightlifting
Commonwealth Games gold medallists for England
Commonwealth Games silver medallists for England
Weightlifters at the 1978 Commonwealth Games
Weightlifters at the 1982 Commonwealth Games
Weightlifters at the 1976 Summer Olympics
Weightlifters at the 1980 Summer Olympics
Olympic weightlifters of Great Britain
Living people
Medallists at the 1978 Commonwealth Games
Medallists at the 1982 Commonwealth Games